This is a list of video games that are part of the Digimon franchise by Bandai Namco Entertainment (formerly Bandai). Most of the games have been developed by Namco Bandai Games and have been released for a variety of home and handheld game consoles, such as Bandai's own WonderSwan. 

Common elements include battles between Digimon, with human "Tamers" present or otherwise, and the ability to "Digivolve" back and forth between several evolutionary forms. Due to similar features and mechanics, several games have drawn comparisons to that of the Pokémon franchise.

Role-playing games

Digimon World series

Digimon Story series

Other RPG games
Despite being marketed as part of the Digimon World series in North America, Digimon World Championship and Digimon World Data Squad are standalone games.

Fighting games

Spin-offs

Others

Mobile

See also

Digital Monster (virtual pet)

References

External links
Digimon (video game franchise) at GiantBomb

 
Digimon (video game series)
Digimon
Digimon
Toei Animation video game projects